Ülo Torpats (15 November 1920, in Tartu – 20 January 1988, in Tartu) was an Estonian philologist and translator.

Torpats graduated from Hugo Treffner Gymnasium in 1940. In 1951, he graduated from Tartu State University with a degree in classical philology. From 1951 to 1953, he worked at the Estonian Academy of Agriculture. From 1955 to 1956 and again from 1960, as a lecturer at the Department of Western European Literature and Classical Philology of the University of Tartu. From 1971 until 1982, he was a lecturer at the university's Department of Foreign Languages.

Works

 Näiteid rooma luulest (1970)
 Lingua latina in medicina (1970, with L. Gross and R. Kleis) 
 Studium latinum (1975, with L. Gross and R. Kleis)
 Ladina-eesti sõnaraamat = Glossarium Latino-Estonicum (1986, one of the authors)

References

Further reading
 A. Kaalep. Mälestades Ülo Torpatsit (15. XI 1920 – 20. I 1988). – Keel ja Kirjandus 1988, 5

1920 births
1988 deaths
Estonian scholars
Estonian philologists
Estonian translators
Hugo Treffner Gymnasium alumni
University of Tartu alumni
Academic staff of the University of Tartu
People from Tartu